Dholpur Junction railway station is a main railway station in Dholpur district, Rajasthan.

Administration
The station code is DHO. It serves Dholpur city and comes under the administrative limit of the Agra railway division of the North Central Railway zone.

Structure
The station consists of three platforms, but some new platforms are under construction. The platforms are not sheltered well. It lacks many facilities, including water and sanitation. It has a wi-fi facility

Location
Dholpur Junction is an important railway junction, having three platforms and is situated in the heart of the city.

The Dholpur railway station was part of the Dholpur–Sarmathura Railway which was owned by Maharaja Rana of Dholpur State and opened in February 1908.

References

Railway junction stations in Rajasthan
Agra railway division
Railway stations opened in 1908
1908 establishments in India
Railway stations in Dholpur district